Kampala University (KU) is a fully fledged, private, chartered, recognized and accredited university  in Uganda.

Location
, KU maintained the following campuses:

1. The coordinates of the main campus are 0°15'38.0"N, 32°38'08.0"E (Latitude:0.260556; Longitude:32.635556).

2.

3.

4. Luweero: Approximately , by road, north of Kampala on the Kampala–Gulu Highway.

5.

6.

History
KU was founded in 1999. The founding vice chancellor, Badru Kateregga, together with other academics and entrepreneurs pooled resources to establish the university. It received its license from the Uganda National Council for Higher Education in 2000.

During the university's graduation ceremony in March 2012, 2,048 graduates were awarded degrees, diplomas, and certificates in various disciplines. Of these, 57.9 percent were male and 42.1 percent were female. Seventy-four graduates received master's degrees and 24 received postgraduate diplomas.

Affiliation
KU is affiliated with The East African University (TEAU) in Kitengela, Kenya. Badru Kateregga, the vice chancellor of KU, also serves as chairman of the board of trustees of TEAU.

Academic schools
KU has seven constituent schools: 
 Faculty of Industrial Art and Design - Ggaba Campus
 Faculty of Computer Science and Information Technology - Ggaba Campus
 Faculty of Business and Management - Ggaba Campus
 Faculty of Natural Sciences - Ggaba Campus
 Faculty of Arts and Social Sciences - Ggaba Campus
 Faculty of Nursing and Health Sciences - Mutundwe Campus
Faculty of Filmmaking - Kampala Film School Ggaba

Courses

Graduate school courses

 Masters of Public Health
Master of Economic Policy and Management
 Masters of Development Studies
 Masters of Environmental Management
 Masters of English Language and Literature Education
 Masters of Educational Management
 Masters of Guidance and Counseling
 Masters of Business Administration
 Masters of procurement and Logistics Management
 Masters of Social Work and Community Development
 Master of diplomacy and International Relations
 Master of Information Technology
 Masters of Medicine and Surgery
 Masters of Economic Policy and Planning

Undergraduate degree courses
 Bachelor of Industrial Art and Design
 Bachelor of Industrial Art and Design with Education
 Bachelor of Arts in Fashion Design
 Bachelor of Arts in Interior Design
 Bachelor of Computer Science
 Bachelor of Information Technology
 Bachelor of Computer Science and Information Technology
 Bachelor of Business Administration
 Bachelor of Procurement and Logistics Management
 Bachelor of Business Computing
 Bachelor of Credit Management
 Bachelor of Secretarial and Office Management
 Bachelor of Leisure Tourism and Hotel Management
 Bachelor of Environmental Management
 Bachelor of Arts with Education
 Bachelor of Public Administration
 Bachelor of Political Science
 Bachelor of Social Work and Social Administration
 Bachelor of Human Resource Management
 Bachelor of Mass Communication.

Diploma courses
 Diploma in Industrial Art and Design
 Diploma in Industrial Art and Design with Education
 Diploma in Art and Fashion Design
 Diploma of Art in Interior Design
 Diploma in Computer Science
 Diploma in Computer Science and Information Technology
 Diploma in Business Administration
  Diploma in procurement and Logistics Management
 Diploma in Business Computing
 Diploma in Credit Management
 Diploma in Secretarial and Office Management
 Diploma in Leisure Tourism and Hotel Management
 Diploma in Environmental Management
 Diploma in Public Administration
 Diploma in Political Science
 Diploma in Social Work and Social Administration
 Diploma in Human Resource Management
 Diploma in Guidance and Counseling

Certificate courses
 Certificate in Industrial Art and Design
 Certificate in Industrial Art and Design with Education
 Certificate in Art and Fashion Design
 Certificate in Art and Interior Design
 Certificate in Computer Science
 and Information Technology 
 Certificate in Business Administration
 Certificate in Leisure Tourism and Hotel Management
 Certificate in Environmental Management
 Certificate in Public Administration
 Certificate in Social Work and Social Administration
 Certificate in Human Resource Management
 Certificate in Guidance and Counseling
 Certificate in English Language Communication

See also
 Kampala Capital City Authority
 Education in Uganda
 List of universities in Uganda
 List of business schools in Uganda
 List of university leaders in Uganda

References

External links
 

Universities and colleges in Uganda
Educational institutions established in 1999
Education in Kampala
1999 establishments in Uganda